Petrus "Peter" Wilhelmus Uneken (born 4 February 1972) is a Dutch professional football manager.

Career
As a player, he played for FC Emmen, FC Den Bosch and Helmond Sport. He retired from professional football in 2009, after which he started his coaching career as a youth coach at FC Den Bosch. 

In 2011, he became a youth coach at NEC, where he stayed until 2014. He then moved to PSV Eindhoven, also as a youth coach. 

On 18 April 2019, it was announced that he would become head coach of Jong PSV, the club's second team, at the start of the 2019–20 season. He left the position ahead of the 2021-22 season, as he was appointed assistant coach of RKC Waalwijk.

References

External links
  Profile

1972 births
Living people
People from Coevorden
Dutch footballers
Association football defenders
FC Den Bosch players
FC Emmen players
Helmond Sport players
Dutch football managers
Eerste Divisie managers
Footballers from Drenthe
RKC Waalwijk non-playing staff
PSV Eindhoven non-playing staff
NEC Nijmegen non-playing staff
Association football coaches